Ackland is an English surname. Notable people with the surname include:

Cain Ackland (born 1982), Australian rules football player
Janet Ackland (1938–2019), Welsh bowler
John Ackland (politician) (1890–1958), Western Australian politician
John Ackland (rugby league) (born 1958), New Zealand rugby coach
Joss Ackland (born 1928), English actor 
Oliver Ackland (born 1979), Australian actor
Rodney Ackland (1908–1991), English dramatist and playwright
Ron Ackland (1934–2013), New Zealand rugby league footballer and coach
Valentine Ackland (1906–1969), British poet
William Hayes Ackland (1855–1940), American author, lawyer and art collector

See also
June Ackland, fictional character from the television series The Bill
Ackland Art Museum, museum at the University of North Carolina at Chapel Hill

English-language surnames